Events from the year 1656 in France.

Incumbents 
Monarch: Louis XIV

Events

Births
 

 April 10 – René Lepage de Sainte-Claire, lord-founder of Rimouski in eastern Quebec, Canada (d. 1718)
 April 12 – Benoît de Maillet, French diplomat and natural historian (d. 1738)
 May 31 – Marin Marais, French composer and viol player (d. 1728)
 June 5 – Joseph Pitton de Tournefort, French botanist (d. 1708)
 July 18 – Joachim Bouvet, French Jesuit active in China (d. 1730)
 July 20 – Johann Bernhard Fischer von Erlach, Austrian architect (d. 1723)
 August 6 – Claude de Forbin, French naval commander (d. 1733)
 August 12 – Claude de Visdelou, French missionary (d. 1737)
 August 16 – Christian Knaut, German physician (d. 1716)
 August 18 – Ferdinando Galli-Bibiena, Italian painter (d. 1743)
 September 6 – Guillaume Dubois, French cardinal and statesman (d. 1723)
 October 20 – Nicolas de Largillière, French painter (d. 1746)
 November 18 – Jacques de Tourreil, French lawyer (d. 1714)

Deaths
 

 
 January 3 – Mathieu Molé, French statesman (b. 1584)
 July 2 – François-Marie, comte de Broglie, Italian-born French commander (b. 1611)

See also

References

1650s in France